Kurt Aßmann (13 July 1883—26 July 1962) was a German admiral.

In World War I he commanded the "Torpedoboat Flotilla Flanders".  In World War II he was head of naval archives until his retirement in June 1943.

References

Literature 
 

1883 births
1962 deaths
Vice admirals of the Kriegsmarine
Imperial German Navy personnel of World War I
German military historians
Military personnel from Saxony-Anhalt